Pakruojis District Municipality is one of 60 municipalities in Lithuania. It is an agricultural district, situated in the north of Lithuania and bordering with Latvia. The rivers Kruoja, Mūša and others flow through the district. Forests occupy 16.7% of the territory of the Pakruojis district.

Pakruojis is known as one of the main centres of traditional Lithuanian brewing, along with Pasvalys and Biržai. The founder of the Lithuanian beer website alutis.lt reports that there are 19 breweries in the Pakruojis district. Most bars in town feature local types of beer. The main park in Pakruojis features a collection of local folk-art wood carvings.

References

 
Municipalities of Šiauliai County
Municipalities of Lithuania